The Longing of Sherlock Holmes (Czech:Touha Sherlocka Holmese) is a 1972 Czechoslovak television film directed by Stepán Skalský and starring Radovan Lukavský, Václav Voska and Vlasta Fialová. The film also features Josef Kemr. Theodor Pištěk designed the costumes for the film.

Plot
Desiring a change of pace, Sherlock Holmes decides for once to play criminal instead of crime-fighter. His attempt is eventually foiled by Watson.

Production
Filmed on location in Prague, Liberec and Hrádek u Nechanic, it was based on an original screenplay by director Stepán Skalský.

Cast
Radovan Lukavský as Sherlock Holmes
Václav Voska as Doctor Watson
Vlasta Fialová as Abrahamová
Marie Rosůlková as Lady Oberonová
Josef Patočka as Sir Arthur Conan Doyle

References

Bibliography
 Hardy, Phil. The BFI Companion to Crime. A&C Black, 1997.

External links

1972 films
1970s historical films
Czech historical drama films
Czechoslovak drama films
1970s Czech-language films
Sherlock Holmes films
Films set in London
Films set in the 19th century
1970s Czech films